The 131st Rescue Squadron (131 RQS) is a unit of the California Air National Guard 129th Rescue Wing located at Moffett Federal Airfield, Mountain View, California.

Overview
The unit was established on 1 October 2003 by the Air Force Special Operations Command as part of a re-organization of Air National Guard rescue units which created separate squadrons for fixed-wing, helicopter, and pararescue elements of the 129th Rescue Squadron. All three squadrons are assigned to the 129th Operations Group. The HH-60 helicopter flight became 129th Rescue Squadron; the HC-130P Hercules flight become the 130th Rescue Squadron, and the pararescue flight became the 131st Rescue Squadron.

The squadron consists of pararescue and support personnel utilizing the helicopter and transport assets of the 129th Rescue Wing. All three rescue squadrons are assigned to the 129th Operations Group.

Operations
When in a theater of combat, squadron members operate at the direction of the overall theater combatant commander and the theater's commander of air forces. In these situations, the 131st is primarily assigned to conduct personnel recovery operations—rescuing downed airmen or other isolated personnel from enemy territory, for example. In addition to combat search-and-rescue missions like these, the 130th may also conduct collateral missions: noncombatant evacuation operations, inter- and intra-theater airlift, and support of special operations forces, for example.

Back at home, the 131st Rescue Squadron furnishes trained personnel to respond to state emergencies, such as natural disasters, and to assist civil authorities in the enforcement of the law. Other 131st missions include non-combat search and rescue (SAR), emergency aeromedical evacuations, humanitarian relief, international aid, counter-drug activities, and support for NASA flight operations.

The 131st RQS has been assigned to support Operation Iraqi Freedom (Iraq) and Operation Enduring Freedom (Afghanistan) in support of the Global War on Terrorism.

Specifics
 Designated 131st Rescue Squadron, and allotted to California ANG, 2003
 Extended federal recognition and activated, 1 October 2003
 Assigned to: 129th Operations Group
 Station: Moffett Federal Airfield, Mountain View, California (Deploys Worldwide)

References

External links

Squadrons of the United States Air National Guard
Military units and formations in California
131